Calyptocephala is a genus of beetle in the subfamily Cassidinae of family Chrysomelidae.

Species 

 Calyptocephala attenuata (Spaeth, 1919)
 Calyptocephala brevicornis (Boheman, 1850)
 Calyptocephala discoidea (Champion, 1893)
 Calyptocephala gerstaeckeri (Boheman, 1862)
 Calyptocephala lutea (Boheman, 1850)
 Calyptocephala marginipennis (Boheman, 1850)
 Calyptocephala miniatipennis (Boheman, 1862)
 Calyptocephala nigricornis (Germar, 1824)
 Calyptocephala paralutea (Buzzi & Miyazaki, 1992)
 Calyptocephala procerula (Boheman, 1862)
 Calyptocephala punctata (Boheman, 1850)
 Calyptocephala ruficornis (Spaeth, 1937)

References 

Beetle genera
Cassidinae